Nanobagrus immaculatus is a species of bagrid catfish endemic to Indonesia where it is found in the Kahayan River drainage of southern Borneo.  It grows to a length of 2.9 cm and has a uniformly dark body with no markings.

References 
 

Bagridae
Catfish of Asia
Freshwater fish of Indonesia
Fish described in 2008